Rafram (II) (read as Rafram) was Babylonian rabbi, of the seventh generation of amoraim.

He was a disciple of Rav Ashi and a colleague of Ravina II. He succeeded R. Geviha as head of the Academy of Pumbedita. He headed the Pumbedita academy for ten years until his death on 443.

References

Talmud rabbis of Babylonia
Rabbis of Academy of Pumbedita